Neny may refer to:

People
 Mohamed El Neny

Places
 Neny Bay
 Neny Fjord
 Neny Glacier
 Neny Island